The London, Tilbury and Southend Railway (LTSR) 79 Class is a class of 4-4-2T suburban tank engines.  They were designed by Thomas Whitelegg, as a development of the earlier 37 Class. They could reach a top speed of 65 mph (105 km/h).

The four locomotives ordered by the LTSR were numbered 79–82 and were named after places in Essex, near the LTSR route. After absorption by the Midland Railway in 1912, they were renumbered 2176–2179 and their names were removed.  The Midland gave them the power classification 3P, and later continued construction; an order for 10 locomotives was delivered in 1923, just after grouping.

List of LTSR locomotives

Additional orders 
In addition to those constructed by the LTSR and MR, 35 were delivered to the London, Midland and Scottish Railway (LMS) – ten in 1923, five in 1925, ten in 1927, and a final 10 in 1930. The ten delivered in 1923 were to an outstanding order placed by the MR, the remainder were ordered by the LMS. The five delivered in 1925 were built by Nasmyth, Wilson and Company, with the other thirty built by the LMS's Derby Works.  In 1947 the LMS assigned them the numbers 1928–1975, to clear their previous numbers for new LMS Fairburn 2-6-4T locomotives, but none of these was applied before nationalisation in 1948, leaving British Railways to apply the numbers 41928–41975.

They were later displaced from the London, Tilbury and Southend Railway and found work on ex-Midland lines in the East Midlands.

Preservation
One, 80 Thundersley has been preserved and is on static display at the Bressingham Steam Museum in Norfolk.

References 

 
 Essery, Bob (2001). The London, Tilbury and Southend Railway and its Locomotives, OPC. 
 Essery, Bob and Jenkinson, David. An Illustrated History of LMS locomotives. Volume 4. Absorbed Pre-Group Classes Midland Division 
 

79
4-4-2T locomotives
Robert Stephenson and Company locomotives
Nasmyth, Wilson and Company locomotives
Railway locomotives introduced in 1909
Passenger locomotives